Naphyrone, also known as O-2482 and naphthylpyrovalerone, is a substituted cathinone drug derived from pyrovalerone that acts as a triple reuptake inhibitor, producing stimulant effects and has been reported as a novel designer drug. No safety or toxicity data is available on the drug.

The drug has been marketed under the name NRG-1, although only a minority of samples of substances sold under this name have been found to actually contain naphyrone,  and even samples that proved to contain genuine β-naphyrone were in some cases also found to contain the 1-naphthyl isomer α-naphyrone in varying proportions, further confusing the reported effects profile.

Use in the United Kingdom
Naphyrone emerged as a new legal high in the United Kingdom only months after the ban of similar drug mephedrone (which was also a cathinone derivative). Until July 2010 the substance was not controlled by the Misuse of Drugs Act 1971 and was therefore not illegal for someone to possess. The Medicines Act prevented naphyrone from being sold for human consumption, and therefore it was sometimes sold as 'pond cleaner' or as another substance not normally consumed by humans.

A study by researchers at Liverpool John Moores University found that only one out of ten products labelled as "NRG-1" actually contained naphyrone when they were subjected to laboratory analysis. Compounds found in products labelled NRG-1 included MDPV, flephedrone, mephedrone, butylone and caffeine, one product tested was inorganic in composition.  In the case of an individual possessing a product labelled NRG-1 that contains MDPV or other illegal substances, they are in possession of a controlled substance.

On 12 July 2010, the Home Office announced that naphyrone had been banned and made a Class B drug, following a report from the Advisory Council on the Misuse of Drugs.

Pharmacology 
As a triple reuptake inhibitor, naphyrone has been shown in vitro to affect the reuptake of the neurotransmitters serotonin, dopamine and norepinephrine by interacting with the serotonin transporter (SERT), dopamine transporter (DAT), and norepinephrine transporter (NET).

One study found that the dissociation constant of naphyrone interacting with SERT is 33.1nM ± 1.1, with DAT is 20.1nM ± 7.1 and with NET is 136nM ± 27. The concentration of naphyrone required to inhibit the transporters by 50% is 46.0nM ± 5.5 for SERT, 40.0nM ± 13 for DAT and 11.7nM ± 0.9 for NET. Of a number of pyrovalerone analogues tested, naphyrone was found to be the only triple reuptake inhibitor found to be active at nM concentrations.

Some samples of β-naphyrone sold have also been found to contain the alternative isomer α-naphyrone, presumably produced accidentally as an impurity in synthesis. The in vitro data available in the scientific literature was all obtained using pure β-naphyrone, and the pharmacological properties of α-naphyrone are unknown, further complicating the pharmacological profile of this little-studied designer drug.

See also 
 α-PVP
 α-Pyrrolidinopentiothiophenone (α-PVT)
 BMAPN
 HDEP-28
 HDMP-28
 MDPV
 Methylnaphthidate
 Naphthylisopropylamine
 N,O-Dimethyl-4-(2-naphthyl)piperidine-3-carboxylate
 2β-Propanoyl-3β-(2-naphthyl)-tropane (WF-23)
 O-2390
 Pronethalol
 Pyrovalerone
 TH-PVP

References 

Cathinones
Stimulants
Pyrrolidinophenones
2-Naphthyl compounds
Serotonin–norepinephrine–dopamine reuptake inhibitors
Designer drugs
Propyl compounds